Ocotillo Airport  is a county-owned, public-use airport located in Ocotillo Wells, an unincorporated community in San Diego County, California, United States.

Facilities and aircraft 
It has two runways with dirt surfaces: 13/31 is 4,210 by 150 feet (1,283 x 46 m) and 9/27 is 2,475 by 150 feet (754 x 46 m). For the 12-month period ending December 31, 2010, the airport had 810 general aviation aircraft operations, an average of 68 per month. No aircraft was based at the airport during that time.

US Navy World War II
During World War II the airport was used by the US Navy and called Naval Outlying Field, Ocotillo Dry Lake. It was used for training and to support Borrego Valley Maneuver Area, Benson Bombing Range and the Borrego Hotel Target Area, as a bub base of Naval Air Base Salton Sea in support of San Diego Naval Air Station. The US Navy returned the airport to the county in 1956. The airport opened in the late 1920s for private planes. In the late 1930 that Navy started to land planes at the private airport and took over the airport when the war started.

See also
California during World War II

References

External links 
 Ocotillo Airport at County of San Diego web site
 Aerial photo as of 28 May 2002 from USGS The National Map

Airports in San Diego County, California